Atani  is a city on the eastern bank of the Niger River in Anambra State, Nigeria.Atani is the headquarter of Ogbaru Local Government Area, a Local Government in the Northern Senatorial District of Anambra State.
It is one of the communities in Ogbaru situated in Igboland. Her political relations  differ not so much from what obtains in other communities in the Igbo enclave. Disparities however exist in terms of geographical location and tradition. The political structure in Igboland begins from the family- Umunna as the smallest unit, and extends to community – Obodo, which is the largest unit.
It was a town populated by early fishermen and migrant settlers. Atani is still the rice, fish, yam and cassava basin of Anambra state, producing most of the food sold in many markets in Delta and Anambra States.
Atani people are Igbos.

Interactions
The levels of inter-communal political relations between Atani and her neighbours is
shown in the numerous traditional political title holders, the Igwe or Eze, the Nze na Ozo,
the Ndi Ichie Ukwu and Ndichie Nta, Chiefs, among many others. These groups form the
joints of the political structure of Atani. Hence, in their meetings and other political
activities such as coronation, ofala celebrations etc, they interact. These interactions form the
bases for inter-village or community relations between Atani and her neighbours. Among
their neighbours include; Odekpe, Ohaita, Ozubulu, Oko, among others. These villages are
further divided into various units for effective interactions.

The few private industries in town involve fish processing and rice packaging.

Notable citizens
 Prof. Ben Nwabueze, the former Nigerian Minister for Education 
 Chief Stephen Osita Osadebe, musician

Political 
The Atani political system is rotatory, which offers  opportunity for the communities to share in their common political heritage.The rotatory nature of traditional rulership in Atani suggests that political interaction could be
peaceful or chaotic or even both. The different political title holders perform different
function in accordance with their position. In Atani it is the Onowu who crowns the king. The
king also performs judicial, executive and spiritual functions with his Ndi-iche uku and
Ndichie Nta. They form the traditional government and are also members of the political assembly that rule their communities .
Besides, in Atani political structure, the interaction cut across sexes.There is the Ada (women
Chiefs) which comprises the eldest daughters in the communities vested with titles. She was
called Oduah Nwanyi/ Ogene in Odekpe, Gegeli in Osamala, and Omu among others. The
Ada was the political head of all the women. She also had ritual and judicial functions to
perform. To take this title, she would kill a cock and give an elaborate feast. As a political head
of all Umuada, she saw to it that peace was maintained among both women and men in the
community. Umuada of the various neighbours of Atani usually supported each other in
running the affairs of their communities. Their active role in Igboland would not be
overemphasized. Hence, in Atani, they are given a pride of place due to their peculiar nature
and operational milieu in Atani political structure and interaction with their neighbours. The
Umuada in conjunction with the male title holder and age grades, plan and perform various
traditional festivals and ceremonies. These avenues serve as platform for inter-communal
interactions and or relations between Atani and her neighbours. Their roles cut across
maintaining peace and setting inter-village disputes and conflict.

Climate
The wet season is warm, oppressive, and overcast and the dry season is hot, muggy, and partly cloudy in Atani. Over the course of the year, the temperature typically varies from 67°F to 88°F and is rarely below 60°F or above 91°F.The temperature in Atani varies so little throughout the year that little can one differentiate hot and cold seasons.

References

Cities in Anambra State